The olfactory tract is a bilateral bundle of afferent nerve fibers from the mitral and tufted cells of the olfactory bulb that connects to several target regions in the brain, including the piriform cortex, amygdala, and entorhinal cortex.  It is a narrow white band, triangular on coronal section, the apex being directed upward.

Structure
The olfactory tract and olfactory bulb lie in the olfactory sulcus a sulcus formed by the medial orbital gyrus on the inferior surface of each frontal lobe. The olfactory tracts lie in the sulci which run closely parallel to the midline. Fibers of the olfactory tract appear to end in the antero-lateral part of the olfactory tubercle, the dorsal and external parts of the anterior olfactory nucleus, the frontal and temporal parts of the prepyriform area, the cortico-medial group of amygdala nuclei and the nucleus of the stria terminalis.

The olfactory tract divides posteriorly into a medial and a lateral stria. Caudal to this is the olfactory trigone, and the anterior perforated substance.

Medial olfactory stria
The medial olfactory stria turns medially behind the parolfactory area and ends in the subcallosal gyrus; in some cases a small intermediate stria is seen running backward to the anterior perforated substance.

Lateral olfactory stria
The lateral olfactory stria is directed across the lateral part of the anterior perforated substance and then bends abruptly medially toward the uncus of the parahippocampal gyrus.

Clinical significance
Destruction to the olfactory tract results in ipsilateral anosmia (loss of the ability to smell). Anosmia either total or partial is a symptom of Kallmann syndrome a genetic disorder that results in disruption of the development of the olfactory tract. The depth of the olfactory sulcus is an indicator of such congenital anosmia.

Additional images

References

External links
 

Olfactory system